The National Pedal Sport Association (NPSA) was a South Eastern USA regional Bicycle Motocross (BMX) sanctioning body originally based in Palm Harbor, Florida. It then soon after moved to Dunedin, Florida, for most of its existence. Then in its last years Pinellas Park, Florida, was its headquarters. For the first six years of its existence it focused mostly on amateur racing since they were stressing the family experience nature of the sport and putting on the fairest and most inclusive races possible, fitting their motto "Ride For Fun". The NPSA ceased operations as an independent sanctioning body after it was bought by the American Bicycle Association (ABA) in 1988. The first joint NSPA-ABA sanctioned race was held on March 19, 1988, at the NSPA track in Ocoee, Florida.

History

The last president of NPSA was Gail Goudey. I served as president from 1985 until the sale of it to ABA in 1988.The last home base of NPSA was in West Palm Beach, FL.ˈˈ

Vital statistics

Proficiency and division class labels and advancement method

Operations
Like the National Bicycle League (NBL) it did not award a year end overall national #1 male or female amateur. Amateur national number ones were awarded within age divisions. The NPSA did have year end overall National No.1 Pro 20" and Cruiser classes. The NPSA did have features particular to it. The NPSA season was really divided up into three: District, State and the three-month-long National season. The District level racing focused the racers on racing on the local level for local laurels without having to travel within the state and between states. The State season was reserved for touring the various NPSA tracks within a state for the State Championship title. The national season was reserved for touring the circuit between the four states the NPSA had tracks in for the National number one titles culminating in a Grand National.

This was not its only unique method of holding races. Another was the "scramble system". The NPSA like the NBL and the now defunct National Bicycle Association (NBA) they used the moto system a.k.a. the Olympic system to determine which riders graduate from the qualifying heats called Motos. In these motos points are awarded to the racers proportional to the position in which they finish. Each moto is run three times, that is the group of racers must race three times with the points awarded during each race to each individual racer being added. For instance say a 10 Expert racer had a class of 8 racers and he came in first in all three runs of his class. He would have a total of three points, 1+1+1 making him a certainty to qualify for the main (or if a large race the semi finals) save for a disqualification for a rule infraction. on the other hand if a racer came in last three times in that class of eight racers then he would have a total of 24 points 8+8+8 making it almost impossible for him to make the main save for someone(s) else being disqualified. The racers with the four lowest points would qualify for the main. However, unlike the conventional Olympic system, in the NPSA added a unique "Scramble system" that would shuffle the racers randomly or scrambled. The racers after each moto, if there were more than eight racers in a class (eight being the maximum number of racers the starting gate can hold at any one time) would be split into two heats, say in a class of 11 15 novices the first group would be six racers the second group would be the remaining 5 racers. Again, nothing unusual. What was unique to the NPSA was after each round, instead of the racers racing the same people they raced against the first time around as was standard practice in BMX, they would very likely race some racers that were in their class but not in the original first moto but the second. The race would be run in the second go round the points added to the previous total as before. Then the riders would be scrambled again and the race would be run for the last qualifying heat. The NPSA's position was that this was fairer since all of the racers had a chance to compete against the eventual winner with the winner not racing either the same easy competition he can beat with little effort with the racers that he have trouble with in other motos. Conversely he also will not constantly going against people he finds hard to beat while others having easy opponents. Of course either scenario could happen with the luck of the draw.

Another unique aspect to NPSA racing was that you moved down a proficiency class when one's birthday occurred. For instance say that on June 30 you were an 11 expert. You have a birthday on July 1, making you 12. Instead of going to the 12 expert class, you were demoted down in terms of skill class back to 12 junior and was required to make expert again.

Until mid 1984, the NPSA had very strict, and to a few outside observers, too strict rules against contact between racers during races. The slightest bumping during a race could result in disqualification. You couldn't block pass, you had to stay in your lane at the beginning of the start (the International Bicycle Motocross Federation (IBMXF) had a similar rule). At one time the NPSA complained to the Orlando, Florida, Parks Department about the National Bicycle League (NBL) making the jumps, in its view, too large at a track they shared with the NBL. Some outsiders went as far as to call it "racing for wimps" in regards to the NPSA. However, these restrictions were greatly relaxed by the time of the July 1984 Supercross nationals. Ironically, this was also the time when Ronnie Anderson, a new top professional in the major sanctioning bodies of the NBL and American Bicycle Association (ABA) was just being noted for his rough, all or nothing desire to win, resulting in numerous wrecks, to the members of the pro class displeasure.

While stressing family and amateur racing, the NPSA did have a pro class with events called "Supercross" held during the year to qualify the pros for the Grand National like the on held in 1982 at Daytona Beach, Florida.

NPSA National number ones by year
Note: Dates reflect the year the racers *won* their plates, not the year they actually *raced* their No.1 plates. In other words, Roy Reboucas won his No.1 plate in 1982 entitling him to race with #1 on his plate for the 1983 season. Roland Veicht then won the No.1 plate in 1983 and raced with #1 on his plate during the 1984 racing season.

CDNE=Class Did Not Exist.

See also
 American Bicycle Association
 National Bicycle Association
 National Bicycle League
 United Bicycle Racers Association
 United States Bicycle Motocross Association

References

External links
 The American Bicycle Association (ABA) Website.
 The National Bicycle League (NBL) Website.

Cycle racing organizations